Sonic the Hedgehog 2: Music from the Motion Picture is the film score to the Paramount Pictures film Sonic the Hedgehog 2 composed by Tom Holkenborg. The soundtrack album was released by Paramount Music on April 8, 2022.

Background
On December 8, 2021, Tom Holkenborg, who composed the first film, was announced to be returning to compose the film's score.

Track listing
All music composed by Tom Holkenborg.

Tracks 17 and 18 briefly reference the Drowning Theme and Death Egg Theme respectively, as the drowning theme was composed by Yukifumi Makino and the Death Egg theme composed by Masato Nakamura.

While not appearing in the official soundtrack, the untitled end credits suite takes references from the track "Sonic the Hedgehog" from the first film, whose soundtrack was also composed by Holkenborg.

Additional music
The film was supported by a single titled "Stars in the Sky" by American musician Kid Cudi, which is featured in the intro and credits sequence.

The following songs were also used throughout the film:
"It's Tricky" by Run-DMC
"1812 Overture, Op. 49" by Pyotr Tchaikovsky
"Here Comes the Hotstepper" by Ini Kamoze
"This Is How We Do It" by Montell Jordan
"Hapa Haole" by Porouchi Nawohi
"Don’t Know Why" by Norah Jones
"Me and You" by Rich White
"Living on the Road" by Federico Rapagnetta, Giuseppe Santamaria, Duilio Sorrenti and Enrico Cosimi
"Severny Kozachok" by Vyvyon John Ekkel
"Dark Eyes (Ochi Chernyje)" by Viatcheslav Grohovski
"Russian Dance 1" by Lee Blaske, Darren Drew, and Brian Reidinger
"Uptown Funk" by Mark Ronson featuring Bruno Mars
"A Summer Place" by Andy Williams
"Aloha Pachelbel" by Drew Lerdal
"Green Hill Zone" by Masato Nakamura
"Barracuda" by Heart
"You Know How We Do It" by Ice Cube
"I Shrink, Therefore I Am" from Ant-Man and the Wasp, composed by Christophe Beck
"Walk" by Pantera 
"The Final Game / Take Me Out To The Ball Game" from The Natural, composed by Randy Newman

References

2022 soundtrack albums
2020s film soundtrack albums
Junkie XL albums
Works based on Sonic the Hedgehog